Triethyloxonium tetrafluoroborate is the organic oxonium compound with the formula . It is often called Meerwein's reagent or Meerwein's salt after its discoverer Hans Meerwein. Also well known and commercially available is the related trimethyloxonium tetrafluoroborate. The compounds are white solids that dissolve in polar organic solvents. They are strong alkylating agents. Aside from the  salt, many related derivatives are available.

Synthesis and reactivity
Triethyloxonium tetrafluoroborate is prepared from boron trifluoride, diethyl ether and epichlorohydrin:

where the Et stands for ethyl. The trimethyloxonium salt is available from dimethyl ether via an analogous route. These salts do not have long shelf-lives at room temperature. They degrade by hydrolysis:

The propensity of trialkyloxonium salts for alkyl-exchange can be advantageous. For example, trimethyloxonium tetrafluoroborate, which reacts sluggishly due to its low solubility in most compatible solvents, may be converted in situ to higher alkyl/more soluble oxoniums, thereby accelerating alkylation reactions.

Structure
The structure of triethyloxonium tetrafluoroborate has not been characterized by X-ray crystallography, but the structure of triethyloxonium hexafluorophosphate has been examined. The measurements confirm that the cation is pyramidal with C-O-C angles in the range 109.4°–115.5°. The average C–O distance is 1.49 Å.

Safety
Triethyloxonium tetrafluoroborate is a strong alkylating agent, although the hazards are diminished because it is non-volatile. It releases strong acid upon contact with water. The properties of the methyl derivative are similar.

References

Reagents for organic chemistry
Tetrafluoroborates
Ethylating agents
Oxonium compounds